Rose is an unincorporated community in Rock County, Nebraska, United States, located on the east side of U.S. Route 183. As of 2015, the hamlet consisted of two houses and a post office.

History
The first post office at Rose was established in 1905 and is still in service. The community was named for the wild rose bushes growing near the town site.

Trivia
Rose is the locus of postal Zip Code 68714.

References

Unincorporated communities in Rock County, Nebraska
Unincorporated communities in Nebraska